The following is a list of burials at the Royal Mausoleum, in Nuuanu Valley (within Honolulu, Hawaii). Many took royal titles after their predecessors; the list below gives birth name as well if different.

Kamehameha Tomb

 Queen Kaʻahumanu (c. 1768–1832)
 King Kamehameha II, Liholiho (1797–1824) 
 Queen Kamāmalu, Victoria Kamāmalu (1802–1824)
 King Kamehameha III, Kauikeaouli (1813–1854)
 Queen Kalama (1817–1870)
 High Chiefess Kamānele (1814–1834)
 Prince Keaweaweʻulaokalani I (January 1832–February 1832)
 Prince Keaweaweʻulaokalani II (1839?)
 Queen Kīnaʻu Kaʻahumanu II, Elizabeth Kīnaʻu (1805–1839)
 King Kamehameha IV, Alexander Liholiho (1834–1863)
 Queen Emma, Emma Kaleleonālani Rooke (1836–1885)
 Prince Albert Kamehameha, Albert Edward Kauikeaouli (1858–1862)
 King Kamehameha V, Lot Kapuāiwa (1830–1872)
 Princess Victoria Kamāmalu Kaʻahumanu IV (1838–1866)
 Prince Moses Kekūāiwa (1829–1848)
 Prince David Kamehameha (1828–1835)
 High Chief William Pitt Leleiohoku I (1821–1848)
 Princess Ruth Keʻelikōlani (1826–1883)
 Prince John William Pitt Kīnaʻu (1842–1859)
 Prince Keolaokalani Davis Bishop (1862–1863)
 High Chief Pākī, Abner Kuhoʻoheiheipahu Pākī (1808–1855)
 High Chiefess Kōnia, Laura Kōnia (1808–1857)
 High Chiefess Bernice Pauahi Bishop (1831–1884)
 Charles Reed Bishop (1822–1915)
  A caskets containing the ʻiwi (bones) of Līloa and Lonoikamakahiki the only discernible remains rescued from Hale O Keawe and Hale O Līloa by Queen Kaahumanu and later transported to Oahu by King Kamehameha IV
 The other remains of 23 kings of chiefs were placed in two caskets containing the ʻiwi (bones) of Keohokuma, Okua, Umioopa, Keaweluaole, Keaweakapeleaumoku, Kuaialii, Kaaloa, Lonoakolii, Kaleioku, Kalaimamahu, and Kaoleioku in one coffin, and in another coffin are the remains of Keawe, Kumukoa, Lonoikahaupu, Huikihe, Kekoamano, Keaweakanuha, Niula, Kowaiululani, Lonoamoana, Lonohonuakini, Ahaula, Okanaloaikaiwilewa. These names are undiscernible in their original forms and historians speculate they may be Keaweʻīkekahialiʻiokamoku, his father and sons, Lonoikahaupu, Kalaniʻōpuʻu, Kaʻōleiokū, and Kalaʻimamahu.

Kalākaua Crypt

 King Kalākaua (1836–1891)
 Queen Kapiʻolani  (1834–1899)
 Queen Liliʻuokalani (1838–1917)
 Prince Consort John Owen Dominis (1832–1891)
 High Chief Caesar Kaluaiku Kapaʻakea (1815–1866)
 High Chiefess Analea Keohokālole (1816–1869)
 Princess Miriam Likelike (1851–1887)
 Archibald Scott Cleghorn (1835–1910)
 Princess Victoria Kaiʻulani (1875–1899)
 Prince William Pitt Leleiohoku II (1854–1877)
 Kaʻiminaʻauao (1845–1848)
 Princess Virginia Poʻomaikelani (1839–1895)
 Princess Victoria Kūhiō Kekaulike (1843–1884)
 Prince David Kawānanakoa (1868–1908)
 Prince Jonah Kūhiō Kalanianaʻole (1871–1922)
 Prince Edward Abnel Keliʻiahonui (1869–1887)
 Princess Abigail Campbell Kawānanakoa (1882–1945)
 Prince David Kalākaua Kawānanakoa (1904–1953), last to be buried.
 A casket with remains of ancient chiefs, perhaps those of  Naihe or Keawe-a-Heulu and Keliʻimaikaʻi

Wyllie Tomb

 Robert Crichton Wyllie (1798–1865)
 Bennett Nāmākēhā (c. 1799–1860)
 Grace Kamaʻikuʻi (1808–1866)
 Thomas Charles Byde Rooke (1806–1858)
 Jane Lahilahi (1813–1862)
 Peter Kaʻeo (1836–1880)
 Albert Kūkaʻilimoku Kūnuiākea (1853–1903)
 Fanny Kekelaokalani (1806–1880)
 Keoni Ana (1810–1857)

John Young Tomb

 John Young (c. 1742–1835)
 High Chiefess Kaʻōanaʻeha (c. 1780–1850)

Unsure
The following are some names whose identities or which tombs they are interred in are not known for sure. The men are identified by a (k) for kāne (Hawaiian for "male" or "man"), and the women by a (w) for wahine (H: female or woman).

Alapaʻi (w), either Alapaiwahine, Kalākaua's great-grandmother, or Julia Alapaʻi, the wife of Keoni Ana
Naʻea (k), probably George Naʻea, the biological father of Queen Emma.
Kaʻeo (k), probably Joshua Kaʻeo, uncle of Queen Emma.
Maikui (w), unknown
Kepoʻokawelo (n), unknown
Nueu (k), unknown
Kakohe (k), advisor of ʻUmi-a-Līloa
Kapiʻolani I, but other sources says she is still buried in the plot at Pohukaina
Timothy Haʻalilio, but other sources says he is still at Pohukaina or buried in a neglected grave in the Kawaiahaʻo Cemetery

References

Further reading

 
Royal Mausoleum Burials
Royal Mausoleum Mauna 'Ala
Burials at Hawaii Royal Mausoleum
Royal Mausoleum, List
Royal Mausoleum of Hawaii, List
Royal Mausoleum (Mauna ʻAla)